Glen Williams Jr. (April 25, 1954 – May 10, 2017) was an American professional basketball player.

Williams was born in the U.S. Virgin Islands and raised in Charlotte Amalie, St. Thomas, where he played baseball as a child before a right arm injury led to him switching to basketball. When he was 15, Williams participated in the 1977 Centrobasket for the Virgin Islands national basketball team. He was the youngest member of the team. His high school basketball coach in the Virgin Islands was from North Carolina and arranged for Williams to transfer to Laurinburg Institute in Laurinburg, North Carolina. He averaged 30 points per game during his first season at Laurinburg and averaged 28 points the following season.

While playing for Laurinburg at Nassau Coliseum before a New York Nets game in 1973, Williams was noticed by Nets head coach Lou Carnesecca. When Carnesecca was hired as the St. John's Redmen head coach the following season, Williams joined the team, becoming a starter during his freshman season and staying in the starting lineup for his entire collegiate career. During his senior season as team captain, he scored 665 points, breaking the Redmen record for most points scored in a season. Williams ranks 10th in total points scored at St. John's. Carnesecca called him "one of the best two-way players we ever had here".

Williams was selected in the 1977 NBA draft by the Milwaukee Bucks as the 27th overall pick but never played in the National Basketball Association (NBA). Instead he played professionally in the Eastern Basketball Association (EBA) and the Western Basketball Association (WBA). Williams played for the Tucson Gunners of the WBA during the 1978–79 season. He was inducted into the St. John's Athletic Hall of Fame in 2000.

Williams suffered from cancer for the last seven years of his life and died aged 63 in 2017.

References

External links
College statistics

1954 births
2017 deaths
African-American basketball players
American men's basketball players
Milwaukee Bucks draft picks
People from Saint Croix, U.S. Virgin Islands
People from Saint Thomas, U.S. Virgin Islands
Shooting guards
St. John's Red Storm men's basketball players
United States Virgin Islands men's basketball players
Deaths from cancer in New York (state)
20th-century African-American sportspeople
21st-century African-American people